EasyGameStation is a Japanese dōjin soft company. They are mostly known for their games Chantelise and Recettear, both localized in English by Carpe Fulgur. They have also produced several fangames.

Games developed
  (2001), a snowball fighting Azumanga Daioh fangame.
  (2001), a puzzle Azumanga Daioh fangame.
  (2002), a volleyball Azumanga Daioh fangame.
  (2003), unofficial sequel to Threads of Fate.
  (2004), a game featuring Hsien-Ko (Lei Lei in Japan) from Darkstalkers.
  (2005), a Read or Die fangame.
  (2005), unofficial sequel to SkyGunner.
 Chantelise – A Tale of Two Sisters (2006, English release in 2011)
 Recettear: An Item Shop's Tale (2007, English release in 2010)
 Angel Express (known in Japan as ) (2008, English release July 15, 2016)
  (2013)
  (unreleased, demo available)

References

External links
 Official website
 EasyGameStation on Giant Bomb
 EasyGameStation on Hardcore Gaming 101

Video game companies of Japan
Doujin soft developers
Video game companies established in 2001
Japanese companies established in 2001